The Forest Song is a poetic play in three acts by Lesya Ukrainka. The play was written in 1911 in the city of Kutaisi, and was first staged on November 22, 1918, at the Kyiv Drama Theater. The work is one of the first prototypes of fantasy in Ukrainian literature.

History of creation 
The draft of the poetic play was written in the summer of 1911 in Kutaisi. The final revision and editing of it lasted until October. In a letter to her sister Olha, dated November 27, 1911, Lesya Ukrainka mentioned her hard work on the drama "Forest Song":

In a letter to her mother, dated January 2, 1912, Lesya Ukrainka mentioned what had inspired her to write the play:

Numerous alterations and additions to the original draft of the manuscript demonstrate Lesya Ukrainka's hard and persistent work on it. The autograph consists of several text layers and reflects the various stages of its creation – from the initial to the final one.

The outline of the first Act is the most interesting. Sometimes it resembles a detailed plan, that includes the content of each individual scene and combines poetic text with prose, demonstrating the work of the writer's imagination.

Plot 
Fairy Drama in Three Acts

 Prologue

Old forest in Volyn, a wild and mysterious place. The beginning of spring. "He who rends the dikes" runs out of the forest. He talks to the Lost Babes and Rusalka, who reminds him of his love, reproaches him for betrayal. Water Goblin argues with Rusalka that she is dating a deceitful stranger. He only tempts Mermaids.

 Act One

Uncle Lev and his nephew Lukash are going to build a house in the same area. Lev is an old man, kind. Lukash is still a young man. The old man tells the boy that he should be careful with the forest dwellers. Forest Elf tells Rusalka that Lev will not offend them.

Lukash makes a flute out of reeds, which is heard by Mavka, who previously talked to Forest Elf. Forest Elf warned the girl to avoid people, because they were only a disaster.

When Lukash is going to cut a birch with a knife, Mavka stops him and asks not to offend his sister. Lukash is surprised to have met such an unusually lush and beautiful young lady in the forest and asks who she is. Her name is Forest Mavka.

Lukash likes the girl for her changeable beauty, kind language, sensitivity to music and beauty. He says that people mate with each other when they love.

The boy also tells Mavka that they are going to build a house in the forest.

Mavka and Lukash fall in love with each other.

 Act Two

Late summer, a house has already been built on the lawn, a garden has been planted. Lukash's mother scolds him for wasting time playing the flute. She shouts at Mavka, calling her useless and sloven. She reproaches her for her clothes and sends her to harvest wheat. But Mavka can't reap wheat, because it speaks to her.

Lukash explains to Mavka that his mother needs a daughter-in-law who would work in the fields and at home. Mavka tries to understand all these laws with her loving heart, but such small worries are alien to her, she lives in the world of beauty.

Widow Kylyna comes to the house. She takes a sickle from Mavka and begins to reap. She jokes with Lukash and then goes to the house. His mother kindly accepts her. Lukash accompanies Kylyna to the village.

Mavka suffers, and the Mermaid soothes her but warns against love, which can ruin a free soul. Lisovyk warns Mavka. He asks her to remember her freedom, the beauty of nature, and to free herself from the shackles of human love.

Mavka is going to become a forest princess again. She dresses in a crimson, silver haze. Perelesnyk begins to court her. They start dancing. But there comes Marishte, who wants to take Mavka away. She shouts that she is still alive.

Lukash treats Mavka rudely and shouts to his mother that he wants to send elders to Kylyna. Suffering from grief, Mavka goes to Marishte herself.

 Act Three

On a cloudy autumn night, the figure of Mavka hangs out near Lukash's house. Lisovyk emerges from the forest. He explains that he ordered to turn Lukash into a werewolf. But Mavka hopes to turn him into a man by the power of her love. Lukash is scared of Mavka, runs away from her.

Kutz says that there is poverty in the Lukash's family, the mother-in-law, and the daughter-in-law are constantly arguing.

Mavka turns into a dry willow, from which Kylyna's boy cuts a flute. Flute says in Mavka's voice: "How sweet it plays, how deep it cuts, it cuts my chest, it takes my heart out…"

Kylyna wants to cut down a willow, but Perelesnyk saves her.

Kylyna asks her husband to return to the village. Lost Destiny comes, pointing to the flute. Lukash gave Mavka her soul but deprived her of her body. But she does not grieve for her body, her love is now eternal.

Mavka's last monologue, where she addresses Lukash is the culmination of the Act.

Lukash starts playing. Mavka flares up with her beauty, and he rushes to her. But she disappears. It's snowing. Lukash freezes with a smile on his face.

Characters

Main characters 
 Mavka
 Lukash

Minor characters 
 Uncle Lev
 Mother of Lukash
 Kylyna
 Children of Kylyna
 Boy (Kylyna's son)

Mythical characters 
 Will-o'-the-wisp
 He who dwells in rock (phantom signifying death and oblivion)
 He who rends the dikes (destructive sprite dwelling in the freshets of spring)
 Water Goblin (Vodianyk)
 Field Sprite (nymph dwelling among the grain)
 Rusalka
 Lost Babes (Water nixies)
 Kutz (Malicious imp)
 Starvelings (based on Percival Cundy translation) 
 Fate (phantom – based on Percival Cundy translation)
 Forest Elf (based on Percival Cundy translation)
 Marishte

Adaptations 
 Mavka: (unfinished) based on Lesya Ukrainka's Forest Song, an opera by Stefania Turkewich, date unknown.
 Forest Song: a ballet by Ukrainian composer Mykhailo Skorulsky created in 1936. It was first staged in 1946 in Kyiv.
 Forest Song: an opera by Ukrainian composer Vitaliy Kyreiko (1957). Premieres in Lviv and the opera studio of the Kyiv Conservatory.
 Forest Song: a ballet by composer Herman Zhukovsky (libretto by M. Gabovych, directed by O. Tarasov and O. Lapauri) at the Bolshoi Theater of the USSR – 1961.
 Forest Song: an opera by Ukrainian composer Myroslav Volynsky. Premiere in Kamianets-Podilskyi at the Opera in Miniature Festival.
 The Forest Song: American video game.
 Forest Song: the play based on Percival Cundy's translation of the drama, performed by the Students` Theatre of the Applied Linguistics Department at the Lesya Ukrainka Volyn National University.

Screen adaptations

See also 
 History of Ukrainian literature
 Kutaisi
 Lesya Ukrainka
 Ukrainian literature

References

External links 
 «Лісова пісня» на сайті «Леся Українка: енциклопедія життя і творчості»
 Тамара Борисюк «Лісова Пісня» Лесі Українки і «Затоплений Дзвін» Гергарта Гауптмана
 Ремарки в «Лісовій пісні»
 «Лісова пісня» на сайті україномовної фантастики «Аргонавти всесвіту»
 «Лісова пісня» на сайті «Чтиво»
 Фрагменти з опери Мирослава Волинського «Лісова пісня» 1, 2, 3, 4
 Л. Українка «Лісова пісня» — гімн чистим почуттям і нашій природі. Газ. «Волинь-нова», 6 серпня 2011 р., с. 6.

Ukrainian poems
Plays adapted into films
Ukrainian plays
1911 plays
Theatre in Ukraine